Khao Thong railway station is a railway station located in Khao Thong Subdistrict, Phayuha Khiri District, Nakhon Sawan. It is located 235.493 km from Bangkok railway station and is a class 3 railway station. It is on the Northern Line of the State Railway of Thailand. The station opened on 31 October 1905 as part of the Northern Line extension from Lop Buri to Pak Nam Pho.

Train services
 Ordinary 201/202 Bangkok-Phitsanulok-Bangkok
 Ordinary 207/208 Bangkok-Nakhon Sawan-Bangkok
 Ordinary 211/212 Bangkok-Taphan Hin-Bangkok
 Local 401/402 Lop Buri-Phitsanulok-Lop Buri

References
 Ichirō, Kakizaki (2010). Ōkoku no tetsuro: tai tetsudō no rekishi. Kyōto: Kyōtodaigakugakujutsushuppankai. 
 Otohiro, Watanabe (2013). Tai kokutetsu yonsenkiro no tabi: shasō fūkei kanzen kiroku. Tōkyō: Bungeisha. 

Railway stations in Thailand